33rd Battalion or 33rd Infantry Battalion may refer to:

 33rd Battalion (Australia), a unit of the Australian Army 
 2/33rd Battalion (Australia), a unit of the Australian Army that served during World War II
 33rd Battalion, CEF, a unit of the Canadian Expeditionary Force during World War I
 33 Battalion (SWATF), a unit of the South West Africa Territorial Force
 Reserve Police Battalion 33, an auxiliary unit of the Third Reich
 Schutzmannschaft Battalion 33, an auxiliary unit of the Third Reich
 33rd Battalion Virginia Cavalry

See also
 33rd Division (disambiguation)
 33rd Brigade (disambiguation)
 33rd Regiment (disambiguation)
 33rd Squadron (disambiguation)